The Afon Marlais is a right-bank tributary of the Afon Cothi in Carmarthenshire, West Wales. It rises on the slopes of Mynydd Llanfihangel-rhos-y-corn and Mynydd Tre-beddau and flows south-eastwards through Brechfa Forest before reaching the village of Brechfa. After a further kilometre it joins the Cothi immediately downstream of Pont Ynys-Brechfa.

References

Rivers of Carmarthenshire